Governor Abbot or Abbott may refer to:

 Edward Abbott, of Forts of Vincennes, Indiana
 Greg Abbott (born 1957), 48th Governor of Texas
 Maurice Abbot (1565–1642), Governor of the East India Company from 1624 to 1638
 Tony Abbott (governor) (born 1941), Governor of Montserrat from 1997 to 2001